Persewa (stands for Persatuan Sepakbola Waingapu) is a Indonesian football team based at Pemuda Matawai Field, Waingapu, East Sumba Regency, East Nusa Tenggara. This team competes in Liga 3 East Nusa Tenggara Zone.

Players

Current squad

References

External links

Football clubs in East Nusa Tenggara
Association football clubs established in 1958
1958 establishments in Indonesia